The 2015 Football West season was the second season under the new competition format in Western Australia. The overall premier for the new structure qualified for the National Premier Leagues finals series, competing with the other state federation champions in a final knockout tournament to decide the National Premier Leagues Champion for 2015.

Pre-season changes

League tables

2015 National Premier Leagues WA

The 2015 National Premier Leagues WA season was played over 22 rounds. This year there was no Finals series, instead with Bayswater City – as the Premiers – competing in the 2015 National Premier Leagues Finals.

Bayswater City completed the league season undefeated, the first occurrence since Floreat Athena achieved the feat in 2007.

Top Scorers

2015 WA State League Division 1

The 2015 WA State League Division 1 Season is the second tier domestic football competition in Western Australia. The 12 teams play each other twice, for a total of 22 rounds. Mandurah City were Champions, but didn't meet all of the Football West eligibility criteria to be promoted to the 2016 NPL competition.

Promotion/relegation play-off

2015 WA State League Division 2

The 2015 WA State League Division 2 Season is the third tier domestic football competition in Western Australia. The 12 teams play each other twice, for a total of 22 rounds. The top team at the end of the year is promoted to the 2016 WA State League Division 1.

2015 Women's State League Premier Division

The highest tier domestic football competition in Western Australia is known as the BankWest Women's State League Premier Division for sponsorship reasons.  The 8 teams play each other three times, for a total of 21 rounds, and with a promotion/relegation system for the bottom team with the State League Division 1. Beckenham Angels won the Women's State Cup.

2015 Cool Ridge Cup

Western Australian soccer clubs competed in 2015 for the Football West State Cup, known that year as the Cool Ridge Cup for sponsorship reasons. Clubs entered from the National Premier Leagues WA, the two divisions of the State League, a limited number of teams from various divisions of the 2015 Sunday League competition, and from regional teams invited from the South West, Goldfields, Great Southern and Midwest regions.

This knockout competition was won by Sorrento, their 3rd title. 

The competition also served as the Western Australian Preliminary Rounds for the 2015 FFA Cup. In addition to the A-League club Perth Glory, the two finalists – Perth SC and Sorrento FC – qualified for the final rounds of the 2015 FFA Cup, entering at the Round of 32, where they were both eliminated.

References

Football West
2015